Juan Carlos Alvarado Prato (born 12 November 1981) is a Venezuelan politician who is Secretary-General of Copei and a member of the National Assembly since 2021.

See also 

 V National Assembly of Venezuela

References 

1981 births
Living people
Copei politicians
21st-century Venezuelan politicians
Members of the National Assembly (Venezuela)